Elections to Tameside Council were held on 7 May 1998.  One third of the council was up for election and the Labour Party kept overall control of the council.

After the election, the composition of the council was:
Labour 49
Independent 4
Conservative 2
Liberal Democrat 2

Election result

References

1998 English local elections
1998
1990s in Greater Manchester